Finnskogen ("Forest of the Finns") is an area of Norway and Sweden situated in the counties of Innlandet and Värmland respectively, so named because of immigration of Finnish people in the 17th century, the so-called Skogfinner/"Forest Finns".

The core area of Finnskogen lies in the eastern part of a small region known as Solør, on the border with Sweden. It is adjacent to the Swedish region with similar Finnish immigration, named Finnskogarna. There are also similar forested areas in other parts of eastern Norway, Brandval, Vinger Finnskog of Kongsvinger (Austmarka), Søre Osen, Finnemarka near the city of Drammen and in Nordmarka just outside Oslo.

History
Finns, or Finnish people, were encouraged to migrate from the Finnish part of the Kingdom of Sweden to Sweden proper, where they were initially well received by the Duke of Södermanland (who became King Karl IX (1604–1611). At the time, the kingdom of Sweden covered both Sweden and Finland, as we know them today. The migrants were settled on crown lands in Värmland and Dalsland to occupy the area immediately adjacent to the border with Denmark-Norway.

More were encouraged to come to Sweden during the reign of Gustavus Adolphus (1611–1632).

The local Swedish peasants did not appreciate the immigrants, who lived by slash-burn agriculture (svedjebruk), and tensions led to persecution. In 1636, a Swedish decree evicted all Finns who were not registered as taxpayers, which in practice amounted to an expulsion of most of the Finns. Most moved across the Norwegian border into Solør, forming a colony at Grue. The 1686 census indicates many there were born in Finland, but had been living in Sweden before eventually settling in Norway.

Their loyalties during the Hannibal War (1643–1645) were with Sweden and some were caught spying on Norwegian troops.

In 1709, the Danish-Norwegian general Hausmann so distrusted them that he ordered they all be evacuated from Solør. The bailiff declined to evict them on the basis that they were subsistence farmers and so poor they would have starved if moved from the land they customarily used.

By the 20th century, the blood had so intermingled that it was probably impossible to find inhabitants of pure Finnish descent in the Finnskogen. But in Grue, over a quarter of the place names are still in Finnish.

References

External links
The history of the Finnish culture in the south of Norway
 The Finnskogen Travel association (Norwegian)

 
Geography of Innlandet
History of Innlandet
17th century in Norway
Värmland